Wiśniowiec massacres (of Poles). In the monastery of Discalced Carmelites and in the city Wiśniowiec (Vyshnivets) in February 1944 an armed group of the OUN massacred 300 Poles who had sought refuge there. Most people were hiding in the monastery and in the abandoned Vyshnivets Palace. At the same time in the village Wiśniowiec Stary took place another massacre, where 138 Poles were killed by UPA.

See also

 Massacres of Poles in Volhynia and Eastern Galicia

References

1944 in Poland
February 1944 events
Massacres in Poland
Conflicts in 1944
Massacres in 1944
War crimes committed by the Ukrainian Insurgent Army
Massacres of Poles in Volhynia
Mass murder in 1944